Al-Azm family is a prominent Damascene family. Their political influence in Ottoman Syria began in the 18th century when members of the family administered Maarrat al-Nu'man and Hama. A scion of the family, Ismail Pasha al-Azm, was appointed wāli of Damascus Eyalet in 1725. Between 1725 and 1783, members of the family, including As'ad Pasha al-Azm, held power in Damascus for 47 years, in addition to periodical appointments in Sidon Eyalet, Tripoli Eyalet, Hama, Aleppo Eyalet, and Egypt Eyalet. The family's influence declined in the 19th century, failing to establish a true dynasty.

Origins
The origins of the Azm family are relatively obscure and evidence has been described as "contradictory and generally unsatisfactory." One of the most prominent families in Ottoman Syria, the Al-Azm's may have originated from the region of Konya in Anatolia; hence, their roots in Turkey may shed light on recruitment and career patterns of the family members who held high positions as Ottoman officers in the Syrian provinces. The Al-Azm's began to emerge as a major influence in the region when Ibrahim al-'Azm, "a rural notable possibly of Turkish stock", went to Ma'arrat al-Nu'man to restore order in the mid-seventeenth century. Upon his death,  Ibrahim al-'Azm's sons, Ismail Pasha al-Azm and Sulayman Pasha al-Azm,  completed their father's task and were rewarded by the Ottoman administration with hereditary tax farms in Homs, Hama and Ma'arrat al-Nu'man.

In an article written by a member of the family, Professor Sadiq Jalal al-Azm, the introductory author, Jean-Pierre Rondas, describes Al-Azm as: 

In addition to the Turkish origin theory, an Arab origin is believed to be possible. In particular, the Azm family is believed to be part of "the Banu Azm tribe of the northern Hijaz, [who] served the Ottomans in the sixteenth century by protecting the Damascus-Medina caravan route, and later migrated to Anatolia, then to Ma'arra." In fact,  However, "there is no proof that the Azms themselves claimed to be of bedouin origin". 

The controversy can be understood in light of statements made by Dr. Shamir Shimon and Dr. Abdul Karim Rafeq. Dr. Shimon Shamir states that "although none of the views is supported by definite proofs, the latter [that is, the Beduin theory] seems to be more acceptable. In the realities of Syria in the seventeenth and eighteenth centuries, it is more likely that a Beduin family in the Ottoman service should become partly turkicized and live for a while in Anatolia than that a Turkish family should seek to derive prestige by falsely attributing its origins to a Beduin tribe." On the other hand, Dr Abdul Karim Rafeq "opts for  the local-origin theory without committing himself to the beduin part." In response to primary sources stating  "that Sadeddin [Pasha al-Azm] was "un autre pacha arabe de nation"; and that Mehmed [Pasha al-Azm] was of an Arab family... [and] that the 'Azms were "Arabs" (awlad al-'Arab) from the Arab lands (al-bilad al-'Arabiyya)," Dr Rafeq advocates for treating these statements with great caution, especially the epithet "Arab", which he takes to mean "local" as opposed to Ottoman. Finally, it is important to note that there is evidence that "Sulayman Pasha al-Azm knew not a word of Arabic whereas Mehmed was apparently thoroughly Arabized".

Rise to power
Ismail Pasha, who later became wāli (governor) of Tripoli, was transferred to Damascus in 1725 at the request of the mufti, after fighting between different factions of janissaries prevented the Hajj caravan from departing on time. His brother became the wali of Tripoli, and his son became the wali of Sidon. In 1730 when Sultam Ahmed III was deposed they were all dismissed, but not for long. Sulayman Pasha al-Azm, brother of Ismail Pasha, became wali of Damascus between 1733 and 1738 and again from 1741 until his death in 1743. He was succeeded by his nephew As'ad Pasha al-Azm who reigned between 1743 and 1757, and was considered the greatest governor of Damascus in Ottoman times. As'ad Pasha overcame all his local adversaries after three years struggle. In his reign Hama and Homs were added to the province of Damascus.

Despite As'ad Pasha's ability to ensure the security of the pilgrim caravan, the new Ottoman authorities in Istanbul deposed him in 1757 after fourteen years of governance. The Grand Vizier at the time, Raghib Pasha, denounced him as a, "peasant son of a peasant," after a deal between the two of them failed. In addition, the Kizlar Agha of Istanbul disliked al-Azm for apparently not taking good care of him when he passed through Damascus on the pilgrim caravan. The Ottoman state was also interested in confiscating the wealth al-Azm accumulated during his tenure in office. The large amounts of money collected made the state revalue its currency. He was transferred to Aleppo and later dismissed and executed. This marked the end of the family's golden age. It continued to assert some influence, and many of its members served as walis later, but its great days were over. The last member of the family to govern Damascus was Abdullah Pasha al-Azm who served intermittently between 1795 and 1807.

Maintaining the family name
In the mid-18th century the al-Azm family reconciled itself to power centres outside the family. Consequently, two members of its family, Layla bint al-Sayyid Ibrahim al-Azm and Khadija bint Nasuh Pasha, were married to Turkish mamluks in the family's service to retain the Azm family name. The lineage descending from Layla indicates that this branch of the family were concentrated around Hama, and many held government posts there.

Legacy
Al-Azm's era brought a building boom to Damascus where dozens of baths, khans, schools and souqs were built, many of which still remain today. Most famous of them are the Azm Palace in Damascus, and the Azm Palace in Hama, both of which were built by As'ad Pasha al-Azm as palatial residences.

Different translation of surname

Last names were not used during the Ottoman era. Family members were using the name Azmzade in the nineteenth century, in reference to the Azm clan with the zade being an addition indicating nobility. The Latin inscription of the name translated from Arabic script has evolved over time and is now written in different ways. Some family members have the family name Azme, Aladem, Alazm, Aladam, Alzm or some other surnames, although they all belong to the same family. In addition, some members of the family that remained in Turkey have a variety of different last names which were selected following the promulgation of a 1934 law which made last names mandatory and banned the use to references of nobility. It is not clear whether some use the surname Kemikoğlu, literally meaning "the son the bone".

Members of the family
 Ismail Pasha al-Azm, Ottoman governor of Hama, Homs, Tripoli and Damascus
 Sulayman Pasha al-Azm, Ottoman governor of Tripoli, Sidon and Damascus, Ismail Pasha's brother
 As'ad Pasha al-Azm, Ottoman governor of Hama and Damascus, Ismail Pasha's son
 Sa'deddin Pasha al-Azm, Ottoman governor of Aleppo and Egypt (among others), Ismail Pasha's son
 Muhammad Pasha al-Azm, Ottoman governor of Sidon and Damascus, As'ad Pasha's son
 Abdullah Pasha al-Azm, Ottoman governor of Damascus, Muhammad Pasha's son
 Azmzade Sadik Al Mouayad, Ottoman governor of Jeddah, Imperial Commissaire in Bulgaria, Salih Azdashir Bey's son
 Haqqi al-Azm, former prime minister of Syria
 Khalid al-Azm, six-time former prime minister of Syria
 Sadiq Jalal al-Azm, Professor Emeritus of Modern European Philosophy at the University of Damascus

Buildings named after the family
 Khan Sulayman Pasha
 Khan As'ad Pasha
 Azm Palace, in Damascus
 Azm Palace (Hama), in Hama

Books published by family members
Azmzade Sadik El Mueyyed, Habes Seyahatnamesi [The Abyssinia Book of Travels], Istanbul, 1904 translated to English by G. Gokkent and family 2021 https://www.amazon.com/Ethiopia-Book-Travels-Giyas-Gokkent/dp/1737129892
Azmzade Sadik El Mueyyed, Bir Osmanli Zabitinin Afrika Sahra-i Kebirinde Seyahati [An Ottoman Officer's Journey in the Grand Sahara of Africa], Istanbul, 1897 translated to English by G. Gokkent 2021 https://www.amazon.com/Journey-Grand-Sahara-Africa-Through/dp/1737129884/ref=sr_1_2?dchild=1&qid=1630652339&refinements=p_27%3AGiyas+M+Gokkent&s=books&sr=1-2&text=Giyas+M+Gokkent

References

Bibliography
 
 
 
 
 
 

 
Arabic-language surnames
Syrian families
History of Damascus
Syrian people of Turkish descent
Syrian people of Arab descent
Political families of Syria